Kenneth Lee "Doc" Sadler (born June 12, 1960) is an American college basketball coach. He was the head men's basketball coach at the University of Southern Mississippi (Southern Miss), a position he held from 2014 through the 2018-19 season. Sadler served as the head men's basketball coach at the University of Texas at El Paso (UTEP) from 2004 to 2006 and the University of Nebraska–Lincoln from 2006 to 2012.

Biography

Early life
Sadler is a native of Greenwood, Arkansas.

Playing career
Sadler received his undergraduate degree from the University of Arkansas, where he was a student manager under legendary coach Eddie Sutton.

Coaching career
Sadler's coaching career started as an assistant with a string of schools before landing a head coaching job at Arkansas–Fort Smith (then known as Westark Community College) and then at University of Texas at El Paso, where he took over for former Texas Tech Red Raiders head coach Billy Gillispie after previously serving as his assistant coach. At UTEP, Sadler led his team to a 48–18 record and two postseason appearances in his 2 seasons at the helm. He departed UTEP for the head coaching job at the University of Nebraska on August 8, 2006 to take over for former coach Barry Collier, who left to become the athletic director at Butler University.

At Nebraska, Sadler inherited a team that had been relegated to the back of the pack in the Big 12 Conference for several seasons, after former coach Danny Nee led the team to five NCAA tournament appearances, an NIT title and a Big Eight tournament title in the 1990s. Sadler failed to find much success in Lincoln, and aside from a victory over then-11th-ranked Indiana, the team again often fell to the bottom of the standings following Nebraska's move to the Big Ten Conference in 2011. He was fired on March 9, 2012 after six seasons without ever making an NCAA tournament appearance. While under Sadler at Nebraska, over 80 percent of seniors who finished their eligibility earned their degrees.

On June 13, 2012, Kansas basketball coach, Bill Self announced the hiring of Sadler to replace Barry Hinson as Director of Basketball Operations. Sadler left Kansas for Iowa State on May 31, 2013 when Sadler was hired to serve as an assistant under Fred Hoiberg. During the 2013-14 season in Ames, Sadler was part of a staff that won 28 games and reached the NCAA Tournament Sweet 16. On May 1, 2014, Sadler was named head coach at Southern Miss. In his five years at the helm, Southern Miss overcame NCAA sanctions related to the previous staff to lead his team to 20 wins and a postseason appearance in 2018-19.

On April 11, 2019, Sadler resigned his position as head coach at Southern Miss and returned to Nebraska as an assistant coach, once again under Hoiberg. On March 18, 2022, Hoiberg announced that Sadler was no longer with the Nebraska program as he had restructured his staff.

On November 17, 2022, it was announced that Sadler had joined the Oklahoma Sooners men's basketball program as a special advisor to head coach Porter Moser.

Head coaching record

References

External links
 Nebraska profile

1960 births
Living people
American men's basketball coaches
Arizona State Sun Devils men's basketball coaches
Arkansas–Fort Smith Lions basketball coaches
Arkansas Razorbacks men's basketball coaches
Basketball coaches from Arkansas
Chicago State Cougars men's basketball coaches
College men's basketball head coaches in the United States
Houston Cougars men's basketball coaches
Iowa State Cyclones men's basketball coaches
Junior college men's basketball coaches in the United States
Lamar Cardinals basketball coaches
Nebraska Cornhuskers men's basketball coaches
People from Greenwood, Arkansas
Southern Miss Golden Eagles basketball coaches
Texas Tech Red Raiders basketball coaches
University of Arkansas alumni
UTEP Miners men's basketball coaches